Per Højholt (22 July 1928 – 15 October 2004) was a Danish poet. Højholt had his debut in 1948 when he published "De nøgne" (The Naked Ones), a series of poems which appeared in the magazine Heretica. His first collection was Hesten og solen, featuring religiously inspired poems. A major work came with Poetens hoved (The Head of the Poet) which appeared in 1963. This collection took a Modernist stance and meant a break with late Symbolism. Although a highly experimental and unorthodox writer, he became a popular poet. This is not least due to Gittes monologer (Gitte's Monologues). He toured the country with his recitals of these monologues which received considerable attention.

Højholt was awarded "Den store pris" from the Danish Academy in 1982 and the Holberg Medal in 1997. A recognized writer, he was included in the Danish Culture Canon in 2006 for the poem, "Personen på toppen".

Højholt was a librarian by profession and worked as such until 1966.

Works

References

External links 
  The Per Højholt Archives of the Royal Library
  Per Højholt's tombstone at Vestre Kirkegård, Silkeborg

Danish male poets
1928 births
2004 deaths
Recipients of the Grand Prize of the Danish Academy
20th-century Danish poets
20th-century Danish male writers